Herbert Harrison Heyes (August 3, 1889 – May 31, 1958) was an American film actor. He appeared in nearly 100 films between 1915 and 1956, including the famed 1947 film Miracle on 34th Street, in which he played an ahistorical "Mr. Gimbel," owner of Gimbel's Department Store. He was born in Vader, Washington and died in North Hollywood, Los Angeles.

Selected filmography

 Wild Oats (1916) - Richard Carew
 The Final Curtain (1916) - Herbert Lyle
 Under Two Flags (1916) - Bertie Cecil
 The Straight Way (1916) - John Madison
 Jealousy (1916)
 The Vixen (1916) - Knowles Murray
 The Victim (1916) - Dr. Boulden
 The Darling of Paris (1917) - Captain Phoebus
 The Tiger Woman (1917) - Mark Harris
 The Slave (1917) - David Atwell
 The Lesson (1917) - John Galvin
 Somewhere in America (1917) - John Gray
 The Outsider (1917) - Trego
 Heart of the Sunset (1918) - Dave Law
 Fallen Angel (1918) - Harry Adams
 Salomé (1918) - Sejanus
 The Bird of Prey (1918) - Robert Bradley
 The Heart of Rachael (1918) - Dr. Warren Gregory
 Her Inspiration (1918) - Harold Montague
 Children of Banishment (1919) - Allen Mackenzie
 Gambling in Souls (1919) - 'Duke' Charters
 More Deadly Than The Male (1919) - Terry O'Hara
 The Adventures of Ruth (1919) - Bob Wright
 Ruth of the Rockies (1920) - Justin Garret
 Deliverance (1919) - Ulysses (uncredited)
 The Land of Jazz (1920) - Dr. Vane Carruthers
 The Blushing Bride (1921) - Kingdom Ames
 The Queen of Sheba (1921) - Tamaran
 Wolves of the North (1921) - 'Wiki' Jack Horn
 The Dangerous Moment (1921) - George Duray
 Ever Since Eve (1921) - Carteret
 Dr. Jim (1921) - Captain Blake
 Shattered Dreams (1922) - Louis du Bois
 I Can Explain (1922) - Howard Dawson
 Don't Write Letters (1922) - Richard W. Jenks
 One Stolen Night (1923) - Herbert Medford
 It Is the Law (1924) - Justin Victor
 The Bachelor's Club - 
 Between Us Girls (1942) - Lieutenant (uncredited)
 Destination Unknown (1942) - Daniels, American Diplomat
 Tennessee Johnson (1942) - Senator (uncredited)
 The Adventures of Smilin' Jack (1942, Serial) - Sir Cedric [Chs. 5-7] (uncredited)
 It Ain't Hay (1943) - Manager (uncredited)
 The Purple V (1943) - American Colonel (uncredited)
 King of the Cowboys (1943) - Arkansas Sheriff (uncredited)
 Chatterbox (1943) - Production Assistant (uncredited)
 Mission to Moscow (1943) - Congressman (uncredited)
 Calling Wild Bill Elliott (1943) - Governor Steve Nichols
 Bombardier (1943) - General (uncredited)
 Pilot No. 5 (1943) - U.S. Attorney at Justice Department (uncredited)
 Spy Train (1943) - Max Thornwald
 Is Everybody Happy? (1943) - Colonel (uncredited)
 Teen Age (1943) - District Attorney
 Mystery of the 13th Guest (1943) - Dr. Sherwood - Plastic Surgeon (uncredited)
 Campus Rhythm (1943) - J.P. Hartman
 Harvest Melody (1943) - Joe Burton
 Death Valley Manhunt (1943) - Judge Jim Hobart
 Standing Room Only (1944) - Colonel (uncredited)
 The Fighting Seabees (1944) - Capt. Millard (uncredited)
 Cowboy Canteen (1944) - Major C. L. Cox (uncredited)
 Million Dollar Kid (1944) - John H. Cortland
 Outlaws of Santa Fe (1944) - Henry Jackson
 Detective Kitty O'Day (1944) - Attorney Robert Jeffers
 Mr. Winkle Goes to War (1944) - Army Doctor (uncredited)
 Wilson (1944) - Senator (uncredited)
 Miracle on 34th Street (1947) - Mr. Gimbel (uncredited)
 T-Men (1947) - Chief Carson
 The Cobra Strikes (1948) - Theodore Cameron / Dr. Damon Cameron
 Behind Locked Doors (1948) - Judge Finlay Drake
 Kiss Tomorrow Goodbye (1950) - Ezra Dobson
 Union Station (1950) - Henry L. Murchison
 Tripoli (1950) - Gen. Eaton
 Bedtime for Bonzo (1951) - Dean Tillinghast
 Three Guys Named Mike (1951) - Scott Bellemy
 A Place in the Sun (1951) - Charles Eastman
 Only the Valiant (1951) - Col. Drumm
 Something to Live For (1952) - J.B. Crawley
 Carbine Williams (1952) - Lionel Daniels
 Park Row (1952) - Josiah Davenport
 Ruby Gentry (1952) - Judge Tackman
 Let's Do It Again (1953) - Mr. Randolph
 Man of Conflict (1953) - Mr. Evans
 New York Confidential (1955) - James Marshall
 The Far Horizons (1955) - President Thomas Jefferson 
 The Seven Little Foys (1955) - Judge
 Love Is a Many-Splendored Thing (1955) - Father Low (uncredited)
 Sincerely Yours (1955) - J.R. Aldrich (uncredited)
 The Court-Martial of Billy Mitchell (1955) - General John J. Pershing
 Willy (TV series, 1955) -  George Pilkington Sr. in episode "Papa′s Hot Tip"
 The Ten Commandments (1956) - Old Councillor (uncredited)

References

External links

1889 births
1958 deaths
American male film actors
American male silent film actors
20th-century American male actors